Tychique Ntela Kalema (born 12 December 1987) is a Congolese footballer who plays as a midfielder for CSMD Diables Noirs in neighboring country Republic of the Congo.

Club career
Kalema was born in Kinshasa. He began his career with SC Cilu and signed 2008 for AS Vita Club. He played for AS Vita Club in the Orange CAF Confederations Cup 2010. On 5 February 2010, he left AS Vita Club with Serge Lofo Bongeli to sign with German club Rot Weiss Ahlen.

International career
Kalema was capped once for the Congo DR national team and represented the country twelve times. Among others he was a part of the team at African Nations Championship 2009.

References

1987 births
Living people
Democratic Republic of the Congo footballers
Footballers from Kinshasa
Association football midfielders
Democratic Republic of the Congo international footballers
SC Cilu players
AS Vita Club players
Rot Weiss Ahlen players
AC Léopards players
CSMD Diables Noirs players
Democratic Republic of the Congo expatriate footballers
Democratic Republic of the Congo expatriate sportspeople in Germany
Expatriate footballers in Germany
Democratic Republic of the Congo expatriate sportspeople in the Republic of the Congo
Expatriate footballers in the Republic of the Congo